A Berkefeld filter is a water filter made of diatomaceous earth (Kieselguhr). It was invented in Germany in 1891, and by 1922 was being marketed in the United Kingdom by the Berkefeld Filter Co. Berkefeld was the name of the owner of the mine in Hanover, Germany, where the ceramic material was obtained. 

The Berkefeld is a good bacterial water filter used in microbiological laboratories, in homes and out in the field.

Design and mode of action 

The filter housing consists of two metal or plastic cylinders sitting one on top of the other. The upper one has a lid and can be filled with impure water. In the bottom of the upper cylinder are one or more holes fitted with diatomaceous earth (Kieselguhr) filter columns (filter candles). The water is forced through the filters by gravity, and then trickles down to the lower cylinder where it is stored and tapped off as required.

Some types of filters are fitted with a carbon core to act as a deodorizing adsorbent. They may also be impregnated with silver to inhibit bacterial growth. Some types, depending on their grade of porosity, also remove certain microscopic fungi and particulate matter.

The filters without silver impregnation are sterilized by autoclaving or by steam sterilizer after a thorough cleaning.

Berkey Filters 
New Millenium Concepts (NMC) Ltd. received a license to distribute British Berkefeld filters in North America. However, they developed their own purification element in 2003, called the "Black Berkey," which is used in "Berkey" water filters. NMC's Black Berkey purification elements employ a mix of six different filtration media, whereas the British Berkefeld water filter's purification elements were composed primarily of diatomaceous earth.

Rainfresh Ceramic Filters 
In the mid 1990s Envirogard Products Limited in Canada developed its own proprietary version of the Berkefeld ceramic filter that would be marketed under the brand Rainfresh. These ceramic filters also utilize diatomaceous earth, but also include a unique blend of other materials that result in a 0.3-micron absolute filter that provides >7-log reduction of pathogenic bacteria.

Types 

The filters are classified according to the diameter of the pores in the ceramic material:

 V (Viel) - Coarsest pores
 N (Normal) - Intermediate sized pores
 W (Wenig) - Finest pores

Usefulness 

The Berkefeld is a cheap, portable and efficient bacterial filter in general, though it does not remove viruses like Hepatitis A and some bacteria such as mycoplasma. Some companies claim that they filter out from between 100% of particles above 0.9 micrometre to 98% of particles above 0.5 micrometre in diameter. These are very durable filters, and the filter elements may be cleaned over 100 times before requiring replacement.

Some of the first Berkefeld filters were used during the 1892 cholera epidemic in Hamburg.

References

External links
Woder Water Filter

Microbiology equipment
Water filters